Wikivoyage is a free web-based travel guide for travel destinations and travel topics written by volunteer authors. It is a sister project of Wikipedia and supported and hosted by the same non-profit Wikimedia Foundation (WMF). Wikivoyage has been called the "Wikipedia of travel guides".

The project began when editors at the German and then Italian versions of Wikitravel decided in September 2006 to move their editing activities and then current content to a new site, in accordance with the site copyright license, a procedure known as "forking". The resulting site went live as "Wikivoyage" on December 10, 2006, and was owned and operated by a German association set up for that purpose, Wikivoyage e.V. (which continues to be its representative association). Content was published under the copyleft license Creative Commons Attribution-ShareAlike.

In 2012, after a long history of problems with their existing host, the English-language version community of Wikitravel also decided as a community to fork their project. In a two-way move, the English Wikitravel community re-merged with Wikivoyage under the Wikivoyage brand. In addition, all Wikivoyage language versions moved their operations to be hosted by the Wikimedia Foundation, a non-profit organization hosting several of the world's largest wiki-based communities such as Wikipedia. Following agreements by the various communities involved and the Wikimedia Foundation, the site was moved to the WMF servers in December 2012 and the whole of Wikivoyage was officially re-launched as a Wikimedia project on January 15, 2013, the day of the 12th anniversary of Wikipedia's launch.

Description

Using a wiki model, Wikivoyage is built through collaboration of Wikivoyagers from around the globe. Articles can cover different levels of geographic specificity, from continents to districts of a city. These are logically connected in a hierarchy, by specifying that the location covered in one article "is within" the larger location described by another. The project also includes articles on travel-related topics, phrasebooks for travelers, and suggested itineraries.

Wikivoyage is a multilingual project available in  languages, with each language-specific project developed independently. While now a Wikimedia project, it was begun independently. Wikivoyage content is broadly categorized as: destinations, itineraries, phrasebooks, and travel topics.

Destinations
Geographical units within the geographical hierarchy may be described in articles, based on the criterion, "can you sleep there?"

The hierarchy includes:
 Continents
 Continental sections (like the Nordic countries)
 Countries
 Regions within countries (provinces, counties, states, groups of states etc.)
 Cities of any size, including fairly small villages if they are tourist destinations
 Districts within large cities
 National parks provided they have accommodation for the traveller

Attractions such as hotels, restaurants, bars, stores, nightclubs, tour operators, monuments, museums, statues or other works of art, city parks, town squares or streets, festivals or events, transport systems or stations, landscapes, bodies of water, and uninhabited islands are listed in the article for the place within which they are located, but they do not get their own articles.

Itineraries
An itinerary describes a group of destinations according to a temporal division rather than a spatial one and will list destinations and attractions to visit during a given amount of time, with recommended durations of stay and routes to follow. Itineraries may cross geographical regions, but usually have a well-defined path.

Phrasebooks
A phrasebook includes:
 An overview of the language, giving a brief history, scope (where it is spoken, how many speakers), alphabet or symbol set, and any other general info on the language.
 A pronunciation guide, with a description of each written symbol in the language (that is, its alphabet), and a pronunciation note for each symbol.
 A phrase list. Each entry in the phrase list includes the word or phrase being translated, the spelling in the local language symbol set as it would be seen written down, and a pronunciation cue.

Travel topics
Travel topics are articles that deal with a specific topic of interest to travelers that is too large or detailed to go in a specific travel guide destination page; travel tips that are so general that they apply to nearly all destinations and do not need to be in each specific travel guide; major events that occur in different places; and specialist travel information, such as regional guides to scuba-diving sites.

Organization and operation

Mode of operation
Wikivoyage uses the free MediaWiki software (developed for Wikipedia) to allow internet-based editing without requiring registration. Quality assurance occurs in the same way as on Wikipedia: through reciprocal control by editors. The use of the same software was intended to facilitate familiarization with Wikivoyage.

Copyright
Wikivoyage licenses its content to the public under the Creative Commons Attribution-ShareAlike license, but not the GNU Free Documentation License. This is intended to facilitate the production of printed guides from a legal point of view. Media files are intended to be published either in the public domain or licensed under multiple licenses (GNU, Creative Commons).

Information structure
The information is built up in a more structured way than usual for encyclopaedias. Articles belonging to a topic are grouped by the categories known from the Mediawiki software as well as through the so-called bread crumb trails which show the geographical connection between the articles.

In the German-language version, different name spaces are used to separate different topics. The main name space contains travel destinations within their geographical hierarchy. Two other important name spaces are reserved for travel topics and travel news, with the intent to allow a tight interconnection between travel destinations and topics.

The content design is decided by consensus of the community of authors.

Languages
At the time of transfer to WMF, Wikivoyage was available in German, Italian, English, French, Dutch, Russian, and Swedish language versions. The Russian-language project is named Викигид (which translates roughly as "wiki guide"). In January 2013, Portuguese and Spanish versions were created, followed in March by Polish and Romanian, in April by Hebrew and Ukrainian, in May by Greek, and in August by Vietnamese. The Chinese version started in January 2014 and Persian in October. The Finnish version launched in November 2016, Hindi in September 2017, and Bengali and Pashto in June 2018. A Japanese version began in August 2020, a Turkish one in 2021, and a Shan one in March 2022.

Statistics

The active sites have  articles.

The top ten Wikivoyage language projects by mainspace article count:

For a complete list with totals see Wikimedia Statistics:

Distribution
The choice of the Creative Commons Attribution-ShareAlike copyright license is intended to allow simplified distribution by mention of the authors, without the need to state the complete license text.

Creative Commons Attribution-ShareAlike allows distribution through mirrors or by other means of modern media. Up-to-date archives are provided on a weekly basis. The files contained in these archives are provided with all the necessary legal licensing information, e.g. the attribution of the authors.

History

The name is a portmanteau of the words "Wiki" (an Internet-based software system that allows change and extension of the text by any user) and "voyage", meaning travel, journey, or trip. It was retained after extensive voting amongst established editors to decide on the post re-launch name.

Launch
Many Wikivoyage authors and administrators started by working on Wikitravel, which was started by Evan Prodromou and Michele Ann Jenkins in July 2003. By April 2004 the wiki's collection totalled over 1,200 destinations. A year later the project was acquired by the for-profit Internet Brands, an operator of media and e-commerce sites. Discontent increased in response to the management style of the new owners, which led to the contributors of the German and Italian language editions leaving to setup their own independent project, while forking the content on Wikitravel.

After about six months of preparation, the non-profit association Wikivoyage e.V. was founded and registered, as both the owner of the domain names and operator of the servers. On December 10, 2006, the project went live online with the initial data from the German-language Wikitravel. After seven months, 40% of the articles were new, rising to 50% after 10 months. At this stage there were still major gaps in the coverage, but there were several articles for travel destinations like Egypt, Thailand and Switzerland and for the travel topic "cycling".

The Italian branch of Wikivoyage was launched on December 10, 2007. The organization of media data and the administration of user access were already applicable for use in branches in other languages.

The project garnered some press reports, particularly by Swiss radio and newspapers. The Tages-Anzeiger from Zurich and the Swiss radio station DRS1 reported broadly on the project and discussed its weaknesses. The project was mainly supported by German and Swiss authors.

Additional languages and migration
In 2012, after a lengthy history of dissatisfaction with Wikitravel's host and owner, Internet Brands, it was proposed that the community at Wikitravel fork their work from Wikitravel and Wikitravel Shared and – together with the existing sites at Wikivoyage – merge to create a new travel wiki hosted by the Wikimedia Foundation, the steward of Wikipedia and a large range of other non-profit reference sites based upon a wiki community culture. After lengthy discussion by users of all three communities, comments by their respective hosts, and confirmation by the Wikimedia Foundation that it would host a travel project if users wished, nearly all administrators and bureaucrats at Wikitravel decided to fork their existing work to Wikivoyage.

The contents of Wikitravel in all languages and its related Commons-equivalent site (for images, video, and other media files) were downloaded on August 2, 2012, as a "database dump" in preparation for such a migration. This content became the starting point for all languages excluding German and Italian, which were already hosted by Wikivoyage. Forking is a normal or anticipated activity in wiki communities and is expressly permitted by the Creative Commons–Attribution–Share Alike (CC BY-SA) copyright license in use on sites such as Wikitravel. MediaWiki, the wiki software used for Wikitravel, included that facility, although Internet Brands disabled the function shortly after this date in an attempt to prevent the data migration. The community discussion at Wikimedia ended on August 23, 2012, with 540 votes for and 152 votes against the creation of a Wikimedia Foundation travel guide. The project began in beta on WMF servers on November 10, 2012 and was launched fully on January 15, 2013.

As part of the migration, it is planned that current owners and user body "Wikivoyage e.V." will remain in place as an associated organization affiliated with the Wikimedia Foundation "at an organizational level". Wikivoyage stated that, freed of the need to maintain its servers, it would be able to benefit by increasing its work related to outreach, community support, discussion and information, and technical enhancements to the site's software.

In September 2012, Internet Brands filed a lawsuit against one Wikitravel administrator, Ryan Holliday, and one Wikipedia administrator, James Heilman, accusing them of trademark breach and commercial misconduct in the proposals affecting that site, with the defendants and Wikimedia rejecting the case as an example of a SLAPP lawsuit—one that is undertaken without plausible legal grounds for the primary purpose of deterring, overwhelming, or frustrating people engaged in fully lawful actions. On November 19, 2012, the claims by Internet Brands were dismissed by the United States District Court for the Central District of California.

Growth trends in number of articles and active users
In 2016 English Wikivoyage experienced an increase in number of articles (about +1% per month) and a stable amount of activity (about 300 monthly active users and 800 total monthly editors).

Historical Alexa rank vs. that of Wikitravel
After a peak in visits and activity between January and March 2013, confirmed by an Alexa global rank of about 8000 in March for English Wikivoyage, 2013 Wikivoyage was for a time between the 20,000 and 30,000 position in the global Alexa rank, lower than Wikitravel's rank which, however, declined from around the 3,000th position in 2011 to about 6,000th in 2015. , Wikivoyage's Alexa rank was between 16,000 and 17,000 and Wikitravel's rank was around 20,000.

See also
 Travel technology
 Travel website

References

External links

 

Creative Commons-licensed websites
Internet properties established in 2006
MediaWiki websites
Multilingual websites
Travel websites
Wiki communities
Wikimedia projects
Advertising-free websites